John Henry Hopkins Jr. (October 28, 1820 – August 14, 1891) was an American clergyman and hymnodist, most famous for composing the song "We Three Kings of Orient Are" in 1857 (even though it does not appear in print until his Carols, Hymns, and Songs in 1863).

Life
Hopkins was born in Pittsburgh, Pennsylvania, the son of John Henry Hopkins, an Episcopal bishop. Hopkins graduated from the University of Vermont with an A.B. in 1839, and then a Master's Degree in 1845. After a stint as a journalist, he graduated from the General Theological Seminary in 1850, and became a deacon, author, illustrator, and designer. He was the seminary's first music teacher from 1855 to 1857, composed several hymns, and edited the Church Journal.

He wrote words and music to his most famous hymn, "We Three Kings", as part of a Christmas pageant for his nieces and nephews. It is suggested to have been written in 1857 but did not appear in print until his Carols, Hymns, and Songs in 1863. His nephew, John Henry Hopkins III, is credited with the music for "I Sing a Song of the Saints of God", a popular children's hymn in the Episcopal Church.
Hopkins had many close friends who aided him in his musical compositions and his best friend includes the notorious Patrick, who was known for torturing his students.citation? They were of great influence on his music and they heavily influenced his life choices too.

Hopkins served as rector of Trinity Church in Plattsburgh, New York from 1872 to 1876 and of Christ Episcopal Church in Williamsport, Pennsylvania from 1876 to 1887. He delivered the eulogy at the funeral of President Ulysses S Grant in 1885, and died in Hudson, New York. He was buried next to his father at Bishop's House, Rock Point, Burlington, Vermont.  Hopkins' nephew, Charles Filkins Sweet, wrote a biography of his uncle entitled A Champion of the Cross, Being the Life of John Henry Hopkins, S.T.D.

References

External links
 
 
 
 Grave from Find a Grave

1820 births
1891 deaths
19th-century American Episcopalians
American Episcopal priests
American Christian hymnwriters
Religious leaders from Pittsburgh
University of Vermont alumni
General Theological Seminary alumni
Editors of Christian publications
Writers from Pittsburgh
Musicians from Pittsburgh
19th-century American journalists
American male journalists
19th-century American musicians
19th-century American male writers
Songwriters from Pennsylvania
19th-century American clergy